Scott Strange (born 7 April 1977) is an Australian professional golfer who competes on the European Tour, OneAsia Tour and the Asian Tour.

Prior to turning Professional, Strange frequently represented the Western Australia amateur team in Australian Golf Union (now Golf Australia) events. He joined the Asian Tour in 2003 via Qualifying School, then had his first Asian Tour success in 2005, when he won the Myanmar Open. The following year he captured the Philippine Open.  Having performed well in tournaments co-sanctioned by the European Tour during 2007, Strange earned a place on the European Tour for 2008 through his position on the Order of Merit.

During his first season on the European Tour, Strange recorded his first win with a wire-to-wire victory at the Celtic Manor Wales Open, which lifted him into the top 100 of the Official World Golf Rankings for the first time. In April 2009 he won the Volvo China Open by one shot.

Amateur wins
1998 Western Australian Amateur
2000 Lake Macquarie Amateur

Professional wins (8)

European Tour wins (2)

1Co-sanctioned by the OneAsia Tour

Asian Tour wins (2)

OneAsia Tour wins (1)

1Co-sanctioned by the European Tour

Other wins (4)
2002 Vanuatu Open
2003 Port Hedland Classic
2005 Vanuatu Open
2012 Nedlands Masters

Playoff record
PGA Tour of Australasia playoff record (0–1)

Results in major championships

CUT = missed the half-way cut
"T" = tied

Results in World Golf Championships

"T" = Tied
Note that the HSBC Champions did not become a WGC event until 2009.

References

External links

Australian male golfers
Asian Tour golfers
PGA Tour of Australasia golfers
European Tour golfers
Golfers from Perth, Western Australia
1977 births
Living people